Salehabad is a fishing village in Manora, in Karachi, Pakistan. Salehabad used to be an island, but is now connected to Manora. It was connected to Karachi via a ferry service to Kiamari.

There are several ethnic group's
 in Kiamari Town, including Muhajirs, Sindhis, Punjabis, Kashmiris, Seraikis, Pakhtuns, Balochis, Memons, Bohras and Ismailis.

Manora is divided into Old Salehabad, New Salehabad and the KPT areas.

Old Salehabad, which is the oldest habitable area of Manora is a dense residential area of the low-income group majority of whom belongs to the fishing community.

New Salehabad, which is the new addition, is inhabited primarily by the middle-income group, majority of whom are retired Karachi Port Trust (KPT) workers and people from different communities.

See also
 List of fishing villages

References

External links 
 Karachi Website

Neighbourhoods of Karachi
Fishing communities
Fishing communities in Pakistan